Warabrook railway station is located on the Main Northern line in New South Wales, Australia. It serves the western Newcastle suburb of Warabrook and the University of Newcastle, opening on 23 October 1995.

Platforms & services
Warabrook has one island platform with two faces. It is serviced by NSW TrainLink Hunter Line services travelling from Newcastle to Maitland, Muswellbrook, Scone, Telarah and Dungog.

References

External links

Warabrook station details Transport for New South Wales

Railway stations in the Hunter Region
Easy Access railway stations in New South Wales
Railway stations in Australia opened in 1995
Regional railway stations in New South Wales
Main North railway line, New South Wales